Hal Erickson may refer to:
Hal Erickson (American football) (1898–1963), American football player
Hal Erickson (baseball) (1919–2008), Major League Baseball pitcher for the Detroit Tigers
Hal Erickson (author) (born 1950), American media historian

See also
Harald Eriksen (disambiguation)